Werner Prauss (26 October 1933 – 7 March 2013) was a German footballer who played for 1. FC Saarbrücken and the Saarland national team as a defender.

References

1933 births
2013 deaths
German footballers
Saar footballers
Saarland international footballers
1. FC Saarbrücken players
Association football defenders